Many people have claimed to have deciphered the Phaistos Disc.

The claims may be categorized into linguistic decipherments, identifying the language of the inscription, and non-linguistic decipherments. A purely ideographical reading is semantic but not linguistic in the strict sense: While a semantic decipherment may reveal the intended meaning of the symbols in the inscription, it would not allow us to identify the underlying words or their language.

A large part of the claims are clearly pseudoscientific, if not bordering on the esoteric. Linguists are doubtful whether the inscription is sufficiently long to be unambiguously interpreted. It is possible that one of these decipherments is correct, and that, without further material in the same script, we will never know which.   Mainstream consensus tends towards the assumption of a syllabic script, possibly mixed with ideogram, like the known scripts of the epoch (Egyptian hieroglyphs, Anatolian hieroglyphs, Linear B).

Some approaches attempt to establish a connection with known scripts, either the roughly contemporary Cretan hieroglyphs or Linear A native to Crete, or Egyptian or Anatolian hieroglyphics. Solutions postulating an independent Aegean script have also been proposed.

Linguistic interpretations

Greek
 George Hempl (1911) (interpretation as Ionic Greek, syllabic writing)
 side A first; reading inwards; side A begins ...

Hempls readings of side A: A-po-su-la-r
ke-si-po e-pe-t e-e-se a-po-le-is-tu te-pe-ta-po. (Lo, Xipho the
prophetess dedicates spoils from a spoiler of the prophetess.) Te-u-s,
a-po-ku-ra. (Zeus guard us.) Vi-ka-na a-po-ri-pi-na la-ri-si-ta
a-po-ko-me-nu so-to. (In silence put aside the most dainty portions of
the still unroasted animal.) A-te-ne-Mi-me-ra pu-l. (Athene Minerva,
be gracious.) A-po-vi-k. (Silence!) A-po-te-te-na-ni-si tu-me. (The
victims have been put to death.) A-po-vi-k. (Silence!)

 F.M. Stawell (1911) (interpretation as Homeric Greek, syllabic writing);
 side B first; reading inward: side A begins  ...
 Steven R. Fischer (1988) (interpretation as a Greek dialect, syllabic writing);
 side A first; reading inwards; 02-12 reads E-qe 'hear ye'.[See book Glyph Breaker (1997) for full account]
 D. Ohlenroth (1996) (interpretation as a Greek dialect, alphabetic writing);
 side A first; reading outwards; numerous homophonic signs
 B. Schwarz (1959) (interpretation as Mycenean Greek, syllabic writing)
 side A first; reading inwards.
 comparison with Linear B as starting point.
 A. Martin (2000) (interpretation as a Greek-Minoan bilingual text, alphabetic writing)
 reading outwards;
 reads only side A as Greek and says side B is Minoan
 K. & K. Massey (1998) (partial decipherment - interpretation as a Greek dialect, syllabic writing)
 reading outwards
 suggest, based on comparisons with Linear B, and a suggestion by linguist Miguel Carrasquer Vidal, that the words marked by slashes are numbers spelled out, so the disk would be a form of receipt for goods, designed to be easily destroyed
 M.G. Corsini (2008, 2010) (interpretation as proto-Ionic language, syllabic writing); side A first; reading outwards; (Italian) 1348 a.C. Apoteosi di Radamanto.

Unknown language
 G. Owens & J. Coleman (2014) (based on Cretan hieroglyphics, Minoan Linear A and Mycenaean Linear B); possibly prayer to a Minoan goddess.

"Proto-Ionic"
J. Faucounau (1975) considers the script as the original invention of a Cycladic and maritime Aegean people, the proto-Ionians, who had picked up the idea of a syllabic acrophonic script from Egypt at the time of the VI Dynasty. He interprets the text as "proto-Ionic" Greek in syllabic writing.

Reading side A first, inwards, he deciphers  a (funerary) hymn to one Arion, child of Argos, destroyer of Iasos. The language is a Greek dialect, written with considerable phonological ambiguities, comparable to the writing of  Mycenean Greek in  hand-crafted by Faucounau to suit his reading, among other things postulating change of digamma to y and loss of labiovelars, but retention of Indo-European -sy- (in the genitive singular -osyo, Homeric -oio).
Faucounau has gathered evidence, which he asserts shows the existence of proto-Ionians as early as the Early Bronze Age and of a proto-Ionic language with the required characteristics during the Late Bronze Age. He has presented this evidence in several papers and summarized it in two books.

The text begins
ka-s (a)r-ko-syo / pa-yi-s / a-ri-o / a-a-mo / ka-s læ-yi-to / te-ri-o-s / te-tmæ-næ
kas Argoio payis Arion ahamos. kas læi(s)ton dærios tetmænai
"Arion, the son of Argos, is without equal. He has distributed the spoil of battle."

Faucounau's solution was critically reviewed by Duhoux (2000), who in particular was sceptical about the consonantal sign s (D12) in the otherwise syllabic script, which appears word-finally in the sentence particle kas, but not in nominatives like ahamos. Most syllabaries would either omit s in both places, or use a syllable beginning with s in both places.

Luwian
Achterberg et al. (2004) interpreted the text as Anatolian hieroglyphic, reading inwards, side A first. The research group proposes a 14th century date, based on a dating of  PH 1, the associated Linear A tablet. The resulting text is a Luwian document of land ownership, addressed to one na-sa-tu ("Nestor"; Dative na-sa-ti) of hi-ya-wa (Ahhiyawa). Toponyms read are pa-ya-tu (Phaistos), ra-su-ta (Lasithi), mi-SARU (Mesara), ku-na-sa (Knossos), sa3-har-wa (Scheria), ri-ti-na (Rhytion). Another personal name read is i-du-ma-na ("Idomeneus"), governor of Mesara.

The strokes are read as a 46th glyph, expressing word-final ti. The text begins

a-tu mi1-SARU sa+ti / pa-ya-tu / u Nna-sa2-ti / u u-ri / a-tu hi-ya-wa
atu Misari sati Payatu. u Nasati, u uri atu Hiyawa.
"In Mesara is  Phaistos. To Nestor, to the great [man] in Ahhiyawa."

Hittite
 Vladimir Georgiev (1976) (interpretation as Hittite language, syllabic writing);
 side A first; reading outwards;

Egyptian
 Albert Cuny (1914) (interpretation as an ancient Egyptian document, syllabic-ideographic writing);

Semitic
 K. Aartun (1992) (interpretation as a Semitic language, syllabic writing);
 side A first; reading outwards;
 C.H. Gordon;
 J.G.P. Best.

Ugric

 Peter Z. Revesz (2016) (interpretation as an Ugric branch language within the family of Finno-Ugric languages);
 side A first; reading outwards;
 Interpretation as a hymn to a solar goddess.

Ideographic

 F.G. Gordon (1931) (interpretation as ideographic writing, translated into "Basque" Reading side B first.
 Paolo Ballotta (1974) (interpretation as ideographic writing);
 H. Haarmann (1990) (interpretation as ideographic writing);

References

Sources

 
 
  — describes Aarten's and Ohlenroth's decipherments.
 
 
 

 
 
 
 
 
 
  
 
 

 

Inscriptions in undeciphered writing systems
Languages of Greece
Minoan archaeology
Pseudolinguistics